Signal Mountain was named in 1916 by Morrison P. Bridgland. It is located in the Maligne Range in Alberta.

See also
 Mountains of Alberta

References

Two-thousanders of Alberta
Alberta's Rockies